Tony Lovasco is a Republican member of the Missouri House of Representatives. He represents the 64th district, which as of 2022 encompasses a portion of northwest St. Charles counties, including a northern part of Wentzville, much of northern  O'Fallon, and St. Paul. Lovasco was elected to the Missouri House in November 2018.

Early life, education and career
Lovasco is a lifelong St. Charles County resident and graduated in 2003 from Duchesne High School in St. Charles. He has attended the University of Missouri–St. Louis. Since his high school graduation, Lovasco has worked in sales for a surplus IT disposition company and has much experience with Linux deployment and maintenance.

Politics
Lovasco is active in local Republican organizations, serving as a committeeman and board member. After district 64 representative Robert Cornejo resigned in August 2018 to take a job in Governor Parson's administration, Lovasco was appointed by local Republicans to replace Cornejo on the November ballot. Lovasco defeated Democrat Shawn Finklein in the 2018 general election.

On May 29, 2020, Lovasco made national news when, during national protests over the murder of George Floyd by a Minneapolis policeman during an arrest four days earlier, he stated on Twitter that "Looters deserve to be shot...But not by Government. #2A."

Lovasco defeated Democratic challenger Aaliyah Bailey in November 2020, with over 68 percent of the vote.

In response to the removal of a statue of Confederate general Robert E. Lee in Richmond, Virginia, Lovasco tweeted on September 9, 2021, that removal of statues of "reprehensible people" should be "fair and balanced", with an included image of the Lincoln Memorial in Washington, D.C.

Legislative assignments
Representative Lovasco serves on the following committees:
 Downsizing State Government
 Ways and Means

In 2020, Lovasco was a member of a special committee on Criminal Justice.

Electoral history

References

21st-century American politicians
Living people
Republican Party members of the Missouri House of Representatives
People from St. Charles County, Missouri
Year of birth missing (living people)